Philip II, Count of Nassau-Weilburg (14 March 1418 – 19 March 1492 in Mainz) was Count of Nassau in Weilburg and shared briefly the regency of the County of Saarbrücken.

Biography
Philip was a son of Philip I (1368 – 1429), and grandson of John I, Count of Nassau-Weilburg (1309 – 1371), with his second wife, Elisabeth of Lorraine-Vaudémont (c. 1395 – 1456).

In 1429, he succeeded his father as count of Nassau-Weilburg, jointly with his brother Johann II ("John"). Their mother was the regent until 1438, when Philip reached majority, but an arrangement was made to provide for their mother. In 1442, the brothers decide to divide the counties: Johann II received Saarbrücken with Seigneurie of Commercy Château bas (this Nassau-Saarbrücken line died out in 1574) and Philip II received Weilburg (this Nassau-Weilburg line died out in the male line in 1912; however, it was continued in the female line to this day).  Ownership of the possessions in the Palatinate (Dannenfels, Stauf, Kirchhein, Altenbamberg, Wöllstein) would be shared between the two lines. Their sisters married lords and did not partake in the inheritance.

Philip II died on 19 March 1492, and was succeeded by his grandson, Louis I.

Marriage and issue 
Philip married Margaret of Loon-Heinsberg. She was a daughter of John III (d. bef. 1441), Count of Loon-Heinsberg, who in turn was the son of John II, Count of Loon.

Philip and Margaret had two sons:
 John III (1441-1480), succeeding his father as Count of Nassau-Weilburg after Philip II's death.
 Philip (1443-1471).

As a widower, he married Veronika of Sayn-Wittgenstein. This marriage was childless.

Ancestry

References

House of Nassau-Weilburg
Counts of Nassau
People from Weilburg
1418 births
1492 deaths
15th-century German people